Mike Leara (born March 27, 1960) is an American businessman and politician. He was a member of the Missouri House of Representatives, having served from 2009 to 2017. Leara is a member of the Republican party.

References

1960 births
21st-century American politicians
Living people
Republican Party members of the Missouri House of Representatives